There are two different kana (Japanese script) representations for the romanization ve:
 ヴェ: U (ウ) with dakuten (voicing marks), followed by a small E (エ)
 less commonly ヹ: We (ヱ) with dakuten